The siege of Naples in 536 was a successful siege of Naples by the Eastern Roman Empire under Belisarius during the Gothic War.
The Byzantine army under Belisarius, having subdued Sicily with ease, landed on mainland Italy in late spring 536, and advanced along the coast on Naples. The citizens of Naples, after being roused by two pro-Gothic orators named Pastor and Asclepiodotus, decided to resist, even though Belisarius presented the city with very favorable conditions for surrender. The citizens of Naples were also under the impression that Theodahad, king of the Ostrogoths, would send an army to relieve them. 

However, the siege dragged on for twenty days with numerous Byzantine casualties, and Belisarius was preparing to abandon it, until an Isaurian soldier under his command discovered an entrance into the city through its disused aqueduct. Belisarius sent engineers to widen the hole in the aqueduct while sending some soldiers to clear out the noise of the engineers working by banging their shields together. After giving the city a final chance to surrender, Belisarius launched his troops in a brutal sack. According to John Julius Norwich:

The Ostrogothic garrison of 800 men was taken prisoner and treated well.The citizens of Naples, meanwhile, angrily killed Asclepiodotus for convincing them to reject Belisarius's demands, while Pastor committed suicide as the city fell.

Sources

References

Naples
Military history of Naples
Naples 536
Naples 536
Naples
Gothic War (535–554)
530s in the Byzantine Empire
536